Maghrebis or Maghrebians is a modern Arabic term meaning "Westerners", mainly referring to the western part of the Arab world and North Africa. Maghrebis are predominantly of Arab and Berber or mixed Arab-Berber origins.

Maghrebis were known in medieval times as the Roman Africans or Moors. The term Moor is derived from Mauri, the Roman name for the Berbers of Mauretania, land of the Moors, the Roman name for the western part of the Maghreb.

Religion

Historic records of religion in the Maghreb region show its gradual inclusion in the Classical World, with coastal colonies established first by Phoenicians, Greeks, and later extensive conquest and rule by the Romans. By the 2nd century common era, the area had become a centre of Latin-speaking Christianity. Both Roman settlers and Romanized Berbers converted to Christianity. The region produced figures such as Christian Church writer Tertullian (c. 155 – c. 202); and Christian Church martyrs or leading figures such as St Cyprian of Carthage (+ 258); Saint Monica; her son the philosopher Augustine of Hippo (+ 430) (1); and Julia of Corsica (5th century). The region was a birthplace of many Christians movements like Arianism and Donatism, now cast-off.

The domination of Christianity ended when Arab invasions brought Islam in 647. Carthage fell in 698 and the remainder of the region followed in subsequent decades. Gradual Islamization proceeded, although surviving letters showed correspondence from regional Christians to Rome up until the 9th century. Christianity was still a living faith. Christian bishoprics and dioceses continued to be active, with relations continuing with Rome. As late as Pope Benedict VII (974-983) reign, a new Archbishop of Carthage was consecrated. Evidence of Christianity in the region then faded through the 10th century. 

During the seventh century, the region's peoples began their nearly total conversion to Islam. There was a small but thriving Local Jewish community, as well as a small Local Christian community. Most Muslims follow the Maliki school of Sunni Islam. Small Ibadi communities remain in some areas. A strong tradition of venerating marabouts and saints' tombs is found throughout regions inhabited by Berbers. Any map of the region demonstrates the tradition by the proliferation of "sidi"s, showing places named after the marabouts. Like some other religious traditions, this has substantially decreased over the 20th century. A network of zawiyas traditionally helped proliferate basic literacy and knowledge of Islam in rural regions.

Recently, the Christian community of Berber or Arab descent has experienced significant growth, and conversions to Christianity, especially to Evangelicalism, is common in Algeria, especially in the Kabylie, Morocco and Tunisia. A 2015 study estimates 380,000 Muslims converted to Christianity in Algeria.

Culture

Diaspora

France
Maghrebis have settled mainly in the industrial regions in France, especially in the Île-de-France and Mediterranean regions. Many famous French people like Édith Piaf, Isabelle Adjani, Arnaud Montebourg, Alain Bashung, Dany Boon, Gérald Darmanin and many others have Maghrebi ancestry.

According to Michel Tribalat, a researcher at INED, there were more than 4.6 million people of Maghrebi origin (with at least one Maghrebi grandparent from Algeria, Morocco or Tunisia) living in France in 2011 (3 million in 1999). Below is a table of population of Maghrebi origin in France in 2011, numbers are in thousands:

Note : for 2nd generation born in France only individuals under 60 are taken into account.

According to Institut national de la statistique et des études économiques (the French National Institute for Statistics and Economic Studies), 16% of newborns in France between 2006 and 2008 have at least one Maghrebi grandparent born in the Greater Maghreb.

In 2005, the percentage of young people under 18 of Maghrebi origin (at least one immigrant parent) were about 7% in Metropolitan France, 12% in Île-de-France, 13% in Lyon, 21% in Perpignan, 22% in the department of Seine-Saint-Denis, 37% in 18th arrondissement of Paris and 40% in several arrondissements of Marseille.

According to other sources between 5 and 8 million people of Maghrebin origin live in France, and between 150,000 and 300,000 people of Maghrebin origin live in Canada.

Genetic evidence

The genetic proximity observed between the North-Africans and Southern Europeans is due to the fact that both these groups shared a common ancestor either in the Upper Paleolithic, in the Neolithic or alternatively during history with the invasion and the occupation during nearly seven centuries of the Iberian Peninsula by Moorish troops. A genetic study published in January 2012 stated that the indigenous Northwest African ancestry appears most closely related to populations outside of Africa but "divergence between Maghrebi peoples and Near Eastern/Europeans likely precedes the Holocene (>12,000 ya)."

Y-chromosome DNA
The Y-chromosome genetic structure of the Maghreb population seems to be mainly modulated by geography. The Y-DNA Haplogroup E1b1b-M215 and J, which are common among Afroasiatic-speaking populations in Africa and the Middle East, are frequent in the Maghreb; especially the haplogroup E-M215 (formerly E1b1b1b, E-M81 and E3b1b) which is typical of the indigenous Berber populations. In some parts of Tunisia, E1b1b-M215 can peak at 100% of the population. Followed by Haplogroup J, especially Haplogroup J-M267 , which is typically Middle Eastern, which can reach frequencies of 40% in the region, and has its highest density founded in the southwestern Arabian Peninsula, Followed by Haplogroup R1 which is primarily concentrated in the Chad Basin, though it is also found in the Maghreb at lower frequencies. These Y-DNA haplogroups are observed in both Berber and Arabic speakers.

The Maghreb Y chromosome pool (including both Berber and Arabic-speaking populations) may be summarized as follows, where only two haplogroups E1b1b-M215 and J comprise generally more than 80% of the total chromosomes:
 E-M215 (mainly E-M81) (50–100%)
 J (mainly J-M267) (0–45%)
 R1b (0–15%)
 Sub-Saharan and other haplogroups (0–8%)

Haplogroup E-Z827 is the most common Y haplogroup among Maghreb Berbers and Arabs, dominated by its subclade, E-M183. It is thought to have originated in Northwest Africa 14,200 years ago. Colloquially referred to as the "Berber marker" for its prevalence among Mozabite, Middle Atlas, Kabyle and other Berber groups, E-M81 is also quite common among Maghreb Arab groups (45% in Oran). It can reach frequencies of up to 100% in the Greater Maghreb.

Regarding J1-M267, according to a recent study in 2011 about Tunisia, it is significantly more abundant in the urban (31.3%) than in the rural total population (2.5%). According to the authors, these results could be explained supposing that Arabization in Tunisia was a military enterprise, therefore, mainly driven by men that displaced native Berbers to geographically marginal areas but that frequently married Berber women.

Mitochondrial DNA
Many studies have attempted to describe the genetic diversity of North-African populations, evaluating mitochondrial DNA (mtDNA) sequence variation and the results may be summarized as follows (data for 536 individuals from 9 populations : Morocco (Asni, Bouhria, Figuig, Souss), Algeria (Mozabites), Tunisia (Chenini-Douiret, Sened, Matmata, Jerba)):
 Total Eurasian lineages (H, HV0, HV, R0, J, T, U (without U6), K, N1, N2, X) : 50-90% with an average of about 5/8
 Total sub-Saharan lineages (L0, L1, L2, L3, L4-L5) : 3-50% with an average of about 2/8
 Total North African lineages (U6, M1) : 0-35% with an average of about 1/8

The North-African mtDna pool is characterized by an "overall high frequency of Western Eurasian haplogroups, a somehow lower frequency of sub-Saharan L lineages, and a significant (but differential) presence of North African haplogroups U6 and M1." According to Cherni et al. 2009 "the post-Last glacial maximum expansion originating in Iberia not only led to the resettlement of Europe but also of North Africa".

According to an Ottoni et al. 2010, besides the "autochthonous" South-Saharan component, the maternal pool of Northern Africa appears to be characterized by at least two other major components: (i) a Levantine contribution (i.e. haplogroups U6 and M1), associated with the return to Africa around 45 kya, and (ii) a more recent West European input associated with the postglacial expansion.

Until recently, some papers suggested that the distribution of the main L haplogroups in North Africa was mainly due to trans-Saharan slave trade. However, in September 2010, a thorough study about Berber mtDNA by Frigi et al. concluded that most of L haplogroups were much older and introduced by an ancient African gene flow around 20,000 years ago.

Autosomal DNA
In an autosomal study in 2012 by Henn et al., the authors conclude that Northwest African populations retain a unique signature of early "Maghrebi" ancestry, but are not a homogeneous group and most display varying combinations of five distinct ancestries (Maghrebi, European, Near Eastern, eastern and western sub-Saharan Africa). The majority of their ancestry derives from populations outside of Africa and is the result of at least three distinct episodes:
 ancient "back-to-Africa" gene flow prior to the Holocene
 more recent gene flow from the Near East resulting in a longitudinal gradient
 limited but very recent migrations from sub-Saharan Africa.

They observed two distinct, opposite gradients of ancestry : an east-to-west increase in likely autochthonous Northwest African ancestry likely derived from "back-to-Africa" gene flow more than 12,000 years ago and an east-to-west decrease in likely Near Eastern Arabic ancestry. The indigenous Northwest African ancestry is more frequent in populations with historical Berber ethnicity. They also find significant signatures of sub-Saharan African ancestry that vary substantially among populations. According to the authors "these sub-Saharan ancestries appear to be a recent introduction into Northwest African populations, dating to about 1,200 years ago in southern Morocco and about 750 years ago into Egypt, possibly reflecting the patterns of the trans-Saharan slave trade that occurred during this period".

Admixture analysis
Recent genetic analysis of North African populations have found that, despite the complex admixture genetic background, there is an autochthonous genomic component which is likely derived from "back-to-Africa" gene flow older than 12,000 years ago (ya) (i.e., prior to the Neolithic migrations). This local population substratum seems to represent a genetic discontinuity with the earliest modern human settlers of North Africa (those with the Aterian industry) given the estimated ancestry is younger than 40,000 years ago. North Morocco, Libya and Egypt carry high proportions of European and Near Eastern ancestral components, whereas Tunisia and Saharawi are those populations with highest autochthonous Northwest African component.

Average ancestry proportions in Northwest African populations - Not using Ancient DNA from North Africa (Sánchez-Quinto 2012)

Average ancestry proportions in Northwest African populations - Using Ancient DNA from North Africa (Serral-Vidal 2019)
According to a recent genetic study in 2019, North African populations have been found to be the result of admixture of extensive gene flow coming from four different geographical (North Africa itself (Iberomaurusian), Europe, Middle East and sub-Saharan Africa) and temporal sources (Palaeolithic migrations, Neolithization, Arabization, and recent migrations).

Iberia
According to a recent autosomal study in 2013 by Botigué et al. using genome-wide SNP data from over 2,000 individuals, "southwestern European populations averaged between 4% and 20% of their genomes assigned to a Northwest African ancestral cluster, whereas this value did not exceed 2% in southeastern European populations". The highest Northwest African admixture (20%) was found into Canarians while in the Iberian peninsula, the average was 10-12%.

A similar 2014 autosomal study by Lazaridis et al. found an average African admixture of 14.8% (12.6% Mozabite and 2.2% Mbuti/Yoruba) in the Iberian Spanish population, confirming that gene flow from Sub-Saharan and Northwest African populations has occurred in the Spanish sample.

In the Iberian Peninsula, Northwest African male haplogroups, especially E1b1b1b (E-M81), E1b1b1a-b (M78 derived chromosomes showing the rare DYS439 allele 10 or E-V65) and a subset of J1 (M267 derived), are found in significant amounts with an average frequency of about 7–8% in the peninsula with frequencies surpassing 10% in some regions, like 18.6% in Cantabria.

Historically introduced NW African types in Italy and Iberia (Capelli et al. (2009))

As an exceptional case in Europe, E-M81 has also been observed at 40% the Pasiegos from Cantabria.

Concerning the level of male genetic admixture in Iberia, a study by Adams et al. 2008 that analysed 1140 individuals in Iberia found a mean Northwest African admixture of 10.6%, with wide geographical variation, ranging from 2.5% in Catalonia, 11.8% in North Portugal, 16.1% in South Portugal, 20.8% in Galicia to 21.7% in North Castile.

MtDna (female lineages) genetic studies on Iberian populations also show that Northwest African mitochondrial DNA sequences (haplogroup U6) are found at much higher levels than those generally observed elsewhere in Europe. Although the overall absolute frequency of U6 is low (2.4%), this signals a possible current North African ancestry proportion of 8–9%, because U6 is not a common lineage in North Africa itself. U6 reaches its highest frequency in North Portugal at about 4-6% where Gonzalez et al. 2003 estimated a possible North African ancestry proportion of 27%.

Iberia is also the region in Europe with the highest frequency of the female mediated mtDNA haplogroup L of Sub-Saharan origin, likely a result of Berber and Arab colonization or African slave trade. Pereira et al. 2005, who analysed 1045 Iberian individuals, found sub-Saharan mtDNA L haplogroups at rates of 11.38% in south Portugal, 5.02% in Center Portugal, 3.21% in North Portugal and 3.26% in Galicia. According to Alvarez et al. 2010 who found L haplogroups at a rate of 4.70% in the Spanish province of Zamora, "as the Hts found in the area are also shared with North African populations, we cannot discard the possibility that these lineages derived from the North African Muslim permanence in the Iberian Peninsula". In another study, Casas et al. 2006 extracted DNA from human remains that were exhumed from historic burial sites in Al-Andalus, Spain (between 12th-13th century). The frequency of Sub-Saharan lineages detected in the medieval samples was 14.6% and 8.3% in the present population of Priego de Cordoba. The authors suggest both the Muslim occupation, and prehistoric migrations before the Muslim occupation would have been the source of these lineages. Brehm at al. 2003 also found a significant Sub-Saharan imprint in the Autonomous regions of Portugal, with L haplogroups constituting about 13% of the lineages in Madeira and 3.4% in the Azores.

Canary Islands
In Canary Islands, a study by Nicole Maca-Meyer in 2003 found mtDna haplogroup U6 at rate of 14% in the present-day Canary Islands populations reflecting the Berber origin of the Guanches, the aboriginal population of the Canary Islands. In this study they compared aboriginal Guanche mtDNA (collected from Canarian archaeological sites) to that of today's Canarians and concluded that, "despite the continuous changes suffered by the population (Spanish colonization, slave trade), aboriginal mtDNA lineages constitute a considerable proportion [42–73%] of the Canarian gene pool". MtDNA haplogroup L were also found at rate of 6.6% and E-M81 at a rate of 8.28% with frequencies over 10% in the three largest islands of Tenerife (10.68%), Gran Canaria (11.54%) and Fuerteventura (13.33%). According to Fregel et al. 2009 the presence of autochthonous North African E-M81 lineages, and also other relatively abundant markers (E-M78 and J-M267) from the same region in the indigenous Guanche population, "strongly points to that area [North Africa] as the most probable origin of the Guanche ancestors". In this study, they estimated that, based on Y-chromosome and mtDNA haplogroup frequencies, the relative female and male indigenous Guanche contributions to the present-day Canary Islands populations were respectively of 41.8% and 16.1%.

An autosomal study in 2011 found an average North African influence of about 17% in Canary Islanders with a wide interindividual variation ranging from 0% to 96%. According to the authors, the substantial North African ancestry found for Canary Islanders supports that, despite the aggressive conquest by the Spanish in the 15th century and the subsequent immigration, genetic footprints of the first settlers of the Canary Islands persist in the current inhabitants. Paralleling mtDNA findings, the largest average North African contribution was found for the samples from La Gomera.

Italy
In Sicily, the contribution of Northwest African populations is estimated to be about 6-8%, which shows a "genetic affinity between Sicily and Northwest Africa". In Italy, North African haplogroups were found especially in a region of Southern Italy (East Campania, Northwest Apulia, Lucera) at frequency of 4.7% due to Frederick II's relocation of Sicilian Muslims in the city of Lucera in the 13th century. Haplogroup U6 have also been detected in Sicily and Southern Italy at very low levels. In a 2014 study by Stefania Sarno et al. with 326 samples from Cosenza, Matera, Lecce and five Sicilian provinces, E-M81 shows an average frequency of 1.5%, but the typical Maghrebin core haplotype 13-14-30-24-9-11-13 has been found in only two out of the five E-M81 individuals. These results, along with the negligible contribution from North-African populations revealed by the admixture-like plot analysis, suggest only a marginal impact of trans-Mediterranean gene flows on the current SSI genetic pool.

France
Haplogroup E-M81 is also found in some regions of France (excluding recent immigration as only men with French surnames were analysed). 2.70% (15/555) overall with frequencies surpassing 5% in Auvergne (5/89) and Île-de-France (5/91).

According to a genetic study in 2000 based on HLA, French from Marseilles "are more or less isolated from the other western European populations. They are in an intermediate position between the Northwest Africans (Algerians from Algiers and Oran; Tunisians) and the western Europeans populations (France, Spain, and Portugal)". According to the authors "these results cannot be attributed to recent events because of the knowledge of the grandparents' origin" in the sample. This study reveals "that the southern French population from Marseilles is related genetically to the southwestern Europeans and Northwest Africans, who are geographically close" and that "a substantial gene flow has thus probably been present among the populations of these neighboring areas".

Latin America
As a consequence of Spanish and Portuguese colonization of Latin America, Northwest African haplogroups are also found throughout Latin America especially in Brazil and Cuba where frequencies surpass generally 5%. and among Hispanic men in USA.

According to Fregel et al. (2009), the fact that male North African E-M81 and female U6 lineages from the Canaries have been detected in Cuba and Iberoamerica, demonstrates that Canary Islanders with indigenous Guanche ancestors actively participated in the American colonization.

Other regions
In other countries, Northwest African haplogroups can be found in France, Sudan, Somalia, Jordan (4%), Lebanon and amongst Sephardi Jews.

Linguistics
The Greater Maghreb have hosted several languages. Berber or also known as Amazigh is the indigenous language family of the region, belonging to the greater Afro-Asiatic family. Two thousand years ago, Punic, Berber and Latin would have alternated in communication among the populations of Northwest Africa and the rest of the Mediterranean basin. The Arabic language as known throughout the region nowadays arrived later in the Greater Maghreb with the historical Arab conquest and Islam. This language ousted the Berber languages in its various variants, although the process was a long time one, Berber has long been a very prominent language in Algeria and Morocco till our contemporary era. Romance language itself might still have existed in the Greater Maghreb in the 12th century. The Greater Maghreb once again became partly Romance with colonisation. From the 1830s, the French began by conquering Algeria, where French was declared the official language of the country. It also obtains the position of highly placed languages of local elites.

In today's Greater Maghreb, Modern Standard Arabic possesses the status of official language in all the region despite Maghrebi Arabic being the languages of most people.

The Berber language also has official status in Algeria and Morocco. While French is doing well in the region at the start of the 21st century.

English is becoming quite popular as a second language subject at schools across the Greater Maghreb.

Arabization

See also
 Arabs
 Berbers
 Hamitic
 Maghrebi Jews
 Northwest Africa
 Numidia
 Carthage
 List of Maghrebis
 E1b1b1b (Y-DNA)
 Berber Revolt
 Berber Spring
 Muslim conquest of North Africa
 Berbers and Islam
 Berber Jews
 Arab-Berber
 Arabized Berber
 Kabylism, Algerianism, Berberism
 Moors
 Barbary Coast

References and notes

External links
 The African roots of Latin Christianity by Henri Teissier, Regional Bishop of North Africa

Maghreb
North Africa
North African people
Arabs
Moroccan people
Algerian people
Tunisian people
Libyan people
Mauritanian people